The 1950 New York Yankees season was the 48th season for the team. The team finished with a record of 98–56, winning their 17th pennant, finishing 3 games ahead of the Detroit Tigers. In the World Series, they defeated the Philadelphia Phillies in 4 games. New York was managed by Casey Stengel. The Yankees played at Yankee Stadium.

Offseason
 October 13, 1949: Billy Martin was purchased by the Yankees from the Oakland Oaks.
 Prior to 1950 season (exact date unknown)
Jim Brideweser was signed as an amateur free agent by the Yankees.
Don Taussig was signed as an amateur free agent by the Yankees.

Regular season

Season standings

Record vs. opponents

Opening Day lineup

Roster

Player stats

Batting

Starters by position
Note: Pos = Position; G = Games played; AB = At bats; H = Hits; Avg. = Batting average; HR = Home runs; RBI = Runs batted in

Other batters
Note: G = Games played; AB = At bats; H = Hits; Avg. = Batting average; HR = Home runs; RBI = Runs batted in

Pitching

Starting pitchers
Note: G = Games pitched; IP = Innings pitched; W = Wins; L = Losses; ERA = Earned run average; SO = Strikeouts

Other pitchers
Note: G = Games pitched; IP = Innings pitched; W = Wins; L = Losses; ERA = Earned run average; SO = Strikeouts

Relief pitchers
Note: G = Games pitched; W = Wins; L = Losses; SV = Saves; ERA = Earned run average; SO = Strikeouts

1950 World Series 

AL New York Yankees (4) vs. NL Philadelphia Phillies (0)

Awards and honors
 Jerry Coleman, Babe Ruth Award
 Phil Rizzuto, American League MVP
 Yogi Berra, 3rd place in AL MVP voting

All-Star Game

Farm system

LEAGUE CHAMPIONS: LaGrange, McAlester

References

External links
1950 New York Yankees at Baseball Reference
1950 World Series
1950 New York Yankees team page at www.baseball-almanac.com

New York Yankees seasons
New York Yankees
New York Yankees
1950s in the Bronx
American League champion seasons
World Series champion seasons